Joseph ben Meïr Ibn Zabara (c. 1140 – c. 1200) was a Spanish-Jewish physicist, poet and satirist. Although much of his work has been lost, he is noted as the author of Sefer Sha'ashu'im, or in English, the Book of Delights.

Life and work
Joseph ibn Zabara (1140-1200) was born in Barcelona in 1140 and lived most of his life there. He was educated firstly by his father, Yosef, a physician and later at the Hebrew School of Medicine in Narbonne under Joseph Kimhi, the founder of the prominent Kimhi family. He was also trained in religious thought, philosophy, astronomy and Arabic.

His only known extant work is the Sefer Sha'ashu'im, or in English, the Book of Delight of the maqāmah genre. The two first known manuscripts were published by Isaac Arish in Constantinople in 1577, and one in 15th Century Paris, but the book is thought to have been finished around 1200. It contains a series of stories and fables, modeled after the Kalilah wa-Dimnah. It also bears similarities to Arabian Nights.

Zabara was probably the first to write Hebrew in rhymed prose, with interspersed snatches of verse, a form used by Arabian poets. The book is thought to be semi-autobiographical, and similarities can be seen in the book and Zabara's life. His work in some sections is philogynist, while in other parts he writes misogynist satires. The work is a unique case, it being the earliest known European series of fables and witticisms which were partly of Indian and partly of Greek extraction.

List of Fables
His fables are as listed below:

References

External links

Further reading
J.N. Mattock, "The Early History of the Maqama", "Journal of Arabic Literature", Vol. 25, 1989, pp 1–18

12th-century Catalan Jews
Medieval Jewish writers
Jewish poets
Medieval Jewish poets
Writers from Barcelona